Sodium erythorbate (C6H7NaO6) is a food additive used predominantly in meats, poultry, and soft drinks. Chemically, it is the sodium salt of erythorbic acid.  When used in processed meat such as hot dogs and beef sticks, it increases the rate at which nitrite reduces to nitric oxide, thus facilitating a faster cure and retaining the pink coloring. As an antioxidant structurally related to vitamin C, it helps improve flavor stability and prevents the formation of carcinogenic nitrosamines. When used as a food additive, its E number is E316. The use of erythorbic acid and sodium erythorbate as a food preservative has increased greatly since the U.S. Food and Drug Administration banned the use of sulfites as preservatives in foods intended to be eaten fresh (such as ingredients for fresh salads) and as food processors have responded to the fact that some people are allergic to sulfites. It can also be found in bologna, and is occasionally used in beverages, baked goods, and potato salad.Sodium erythorbate is produced from sugars derived from different sources, such as beets, sugarcane, and corn. Sodium erythorbate is usually produced via a fermentation process from D-glucose by Pseudomonas fluorescens bacteria. Most syntheses proceed through the 2-keto-D-gluconic acid intermediate. An urban myth claims that sodium erythorbate is made from ground earthworms; however, there is no truth to the myth.   It is thought that the origin of the legend comes from the similarity of the chemical name to the words earthworm and bait.

Alternative applications include the development of additives that could be utilized as antioxidants in general. For instance, this substance has been implemented in the development of corrosion inhibitors for metals and it has been implemented in active packaging. Furthermore, sodium erythorbate's antioxidative properties have been shown to reduce the production thiobarbituric acid reactive substances (TBARS) in frozen meats, effectively increasing their shelf-life.

Sodium erythorbate is soluble in water. The pH of the aqueous solution of the sodium salt is between 5 and 6. A 10% solution, made from commercial grade sodium erythorbate, may have a pH of 7.2 to 7.9. In its dry, crystalline state it is nonreactive. But, when in solution with water it readily reacts with atmospheric oxygen and other oxidizing agents, which makes it a valuable antioxidant.

References

Food antioxidants
Organic sodium salts
E-number additives